Trechus tesnensis is a species of ground beetle in the subfamily Trechinae. It was described by Belousov & Kabak in 1999.

References

tesnensis
Beetles described in 1999